Old Edgebrook is a historic district and neighborhood in the Forest Glen community area of Chicago, Illinois, United States.

It is located between Central and Devon Avenues and the Edgebrook Golf Course. It is surrounded on all sides by Cook County Forest Preserves.

History
The district's homes were first built in 1894 by various architects. Consisting of several blocks of large, stately houses, it was originally built for railroad executives.

It was designated a Chicago Landmark on December 14, 1988.

Mary Burkemeier Quinn Park of Trees
The Mary Burkemeier Quinn Park of Trees is the only Park District property in Old Edgebrook. According to a plaque in the park, it was a gift from Edward M. Quinn, whose house formerly stood on the site, in memory of his wife Mary Burkemeier Quinn. His will instructed that his house be demolished, a minimum of 21 trees be planted on the property, and the property deed to be given to the Chicago Park District.

References

Historic districts in Chicago
North Side, Chicago
Neighborhoods in Chicago
Chicago Landmarks
Populated places established in 1894